The Queensland Institute of Architects was a professional society for architects in Queensland, Australia. It operated from 1888 until 1930, when it became a chapter of the Australian Institute of Architects.

History

The Queensland Institute of Architects was established in September 1888 in Brisbane with 16 members and Francis Drummond Greville Stanley as its president. Apart from Stanley, its founding members included:
 Richard Gailey (vice president)
 George Henry Male Addison
 Claude William Chambers
 John James Clark
 John Jacob Cohen
 Francis Richard Hall
 Henry Hunter

Presidents
 1888: Francis Drummond Greville Stanley
 1918–19: George Brockwell Gill
 1923–24: Thomas Blair Moncrieff Wightman
 1927–1931: Lange Powell

Other notable members 
 Leslie Corrie

See also

Architecture of Australia

References

External links 
 

Architecture organisations based in Australia
Professional associations based in Australia
Organizations established in 1888
Architecture-related professional associations
Architects from Queensland
1930 disestablishments in Australia
1888 establishments in Australia